Doomsday Rock 'n Roll is an album by Norwegian  / hard rock band Chrome Division.

The album reached #31 on the Norwegian albums chart.

Track listing
"Doomsday Overture" – 1:30
"Serial Killer" – 3:46
"Hate" – 3:50
"Trouble With the Law" – 4:44
"Chrome Division" – 3:50
"Here Comes Another One" – 3:04
"1st Regiment" – 5:25
"Breathe Easy" – 3:46
"The Angel Falls" – 4:16
"Till the Break of Dawn" – 3:30
"We Want More" – 6:17
"When the Shit Hits the Fan" – 2:08

Credits
'''Chrome Division
 (Shagrath) - Rhythm guitar
Ricky Black - Lead guitar
Björn Luna - Bass guitar 
Tony White -Drums
Eddie Guz - Vocals

References

2006 debut albums
Chrome Division albums
Nuclear Blast albums